Sociedad Deportiva Huesca "B" is a Spanish football team based in Huesca, in the autonomous community of Aragon. The reserve team of SD Huesca was initially founded in 1950, and plays in Tercera Federación – Group 17, holding home matches at Complejo Deportivo San Jorge.

History
Founded in the 1950 summer as Grupo Deportivo Lamusa Educación y Descanso, the club was incorporated into SD Huesca's structure in 1976, being promoted to Tercera División in the first season after that. Immediately relegated back, the club suffered another relegation before ceasing activities in 1989.

Huesca B returned to an active status in 2003, only playing four seasons in the two lowest divisions of the Aragonese football before ceasing activities again in 2007. Ten years later, the club returned in the Tercera Regional (seventh division), and achieved three consecutive promotions until reaching the fourth tier in 2020. Another promotion followed in 2021, to the new fourth tier called Segunda División RFEF.

Season to season
As GD Lamusa EyD

As SD Huesca B

1 season in Segunda División RFEF
2 seasons in Tercera División
1 season in Tercera Federación

Current squad

From Youth Academy

Out on loan

See also
SD Huesca
CD Teruel

References

External links
Official website 
 

Football clubs in Aragon
Association football clubs established in 1950
1950 establishments in Spain

Spanish reserve football teams